Bertolonia is a genus consisting of 14 species of pretty, dwarf, creeping, tender perennials, native to tropical South America. These herbaceous plants are grown for their colorful, velvety, ornamental foliages, vary from shimmery white with purple, pink with purple, or bronze-green with carmine and lighter midribs, purple beneath. Leaves are coarsely hairy, oval 7 cm (3 in) long on short stalks. The plants bear clusters of small, bell-shaped flowers repeatedly, just above the leaves, color ranges from pink, red, yellow to purple.

Species
Bertolonia argyrea
Bertolonia guttata
Bertolonia houttea
Bertolonia maculata
Bertolonia marmorata
Bertolonia mosenii
Bertolonia sp iporanga
Bertolonia venezuelensis
Bertolonia wentii

References

Botanica_Sistematica

Melastomataceae genera
Melastomataceae